Karen Klincewicz Gleason is the Associate Provost at the Massachusetts Institute of Technology, where she has also served as the Alexander and I. Michael Kasser Professor of Chemical Engineering, from 2006–present. She has invented over 15 patented designs. She has developed a hydrophobic surface that can be applied in energy harvesting.

Gleason was elected a member of the National Academy of Engineering in 2015 for invention, application development, scale-up, and commercialization of chemically vapor deposited polymers.

Academic life
Karen Gleason received her S.B. and S.M. in Chemical Engineering at Massachusetts Institute of Technology in 1982. She earned her Ph.D in Chemical Engineering at the University of California at Berkeley on 1987. During her time as a graduate student, she helped develop the Klincewicz method.

Research
Professor Gleason's research is on Chemical Vapor Deposition (CVD) of thin polymer films. Gleason's research on CVD has led to novel antifouling coatings for membranes, to inhibit biofilm development, through the use of zwitterionic moieties. She has also made significant advances in other organic surfaces and devices.

Personal life
During her time at MIT, she was the captain of the Women's Varsity Swimming team. She received All-American NCAA Division III accolades all her four years as an undergraduate.

Honors and awards
 Member of the National Academy of Engineering, 2015
Chair, 5th International Conference on Hot-Wire Chemical Vapor Deposition, 2008
Guest Editor of Special Issue on CVD of Polymeric Materials in Chemical Vapor Deposition, 2008
Donders Visiting Professorship Chair, Utrecht University, Netherlands, 2006
Excellence Award for Research in Manufacturing and Environment, Safety and Health;sponsored by Semiconductor Research Corporation and International SEMATECH, 2000
Tenth Annual Van Ness Award Lecturer, Rensselaer Polytechnic Institute, 2000
Chair, Gordon Conference of Diamond Synthesis, Oxford UK, 1998 
All-American NCAA Division III Swimming, 1978–82

References 

Living people
MIT School of Engineering alumni
UC Berkeley College of Chemistry alumni
Year of birth missing (living people)
MIT School of Engineering faculty